Statistics of Allsvenskan in season 1953–54.

Overview
The league was contested by 12 teams, with GAIS winning the championship.

League table

Results

Footnotes

References 

Allsvenskan seasons
1953–54 in Swedish association football leagues
Sweden